Tarmo Rüütli (born 11 August 1954) is an Estonian football manager and former football player.

As player, Rüütli won the 1985 Estonian Championship with Pärnu Kalakombinaat/MEK. As manager, he led Levadia to three Meistriliiga titles and three Estonian Cups, and Flora to one Estonian Cup and one Estonian Supercup. Rüütli has served as the manager of the Estonia national team twice, from 1999 to 2000 and from 2008 to 2013. He led the team to their highest ever FIFA ranking of 47th in 2012, and came close to qualifying for a major tournament for the first time in Estonia's history, reaching the UEFA Euro 2012 qualifying play-offs.

Honours

Player
Pärnu Kalakombinaat/MEK
 Estonian Championship: 1985

Manager
Levadia
 Meistriliiga: 2004, 2006, 2007
 Estonian Cup: 2003–04, 2004–05, 2006–07

Flora
 Estonian Cup: 2008–09
 Estonian Supercup: 2009

Individual
 Estonian Coach of the Year: 2011
  Order of the White Star, 4th Class

References

External links

1954 births
Living people
Sportspeople from Viljandi
Estonian football managers
Estonian footballers
Soviet footballers
FC Flora managers
Viljandi JK Tulevik managers
FCI Levadia Tallinn managers
Estonia national football team managers
Recipients of the Order of the White Star, 4th Class
Association football midfielders
Estonian expatriate football managers
FC Nõmme United managers